Events from the year 1809 in literature.

Events

February 24 – The Theatre Royal, Drury Lane, London, is destroyed by fire. When found drinking wine in the street while watching the conflagration, Richard Brinsley Sheridan, the proprietor, is reported as saying: "A man may surely be allowed to take a glass of wine by his own fireside." The putative manuscript of The History of Cardenio may have been lost in the blaze.
March 1 – The literary and political periodical The Quarterly Review is first published by John Murray in London.
June 1 – Samuel Taylor Coleridge founds The Friend, a weekly periodical which runs for some 25 issues.
July 7 – Jane Austen settles with her sister and mother at Chawton Cottage in Chawton, near Alton, Hampshire and she resumes writing regularly.
September 18 – A new Theatre Royal, Covent Garden, London, opens to replace the first, which burnt down in 1808. The first play performed is Macbeth. Raised ticket prices cause the Old Price Riots, which last for 64 days, until the manager, John Philip Kemble, reverses the increases.
Uncertain dates
The Walnut Street Theatre, Philadelphia, United States, is opened as "The New Circus" by the Circus of Pepin and Breschard. It becomes the oldest continually operating playhouse in the English-speaking world and the oldest in the United States.
William Combe begins publication of the verse Tour of Dr Syntax in search of the Picturesque in Ackermann's Political Magazine (London), illustrated by Thomas Rowlandson, satirising William Gilpin's views on the picturesque.

New books

Fiction
Thomas Campbell – Gertrude of Wyoming
François-René de Chateaubriand – Les Martyrs
Catherine Cuthbertson – Romance of the Pyrenees
Thomas Frognall Dibdin – Bibliomania; or Book-Madness: a bibliographical romance
Maria Edgeworth – Ennui and Manœuvering
E. M. Foster – The Corinna of England, and a Heroine in the Shade: A Modern Romance
Johann Wolfgang von Goethe – Elective Affinities (Die Wahlverwandtschaften)
Stéphanie Félicité, Comtesse de Genlis – Alphonso
Anne Grant – Memoirs of an American Lady
Sarah Green – Tales of the Manor
E. T. A. Hoffmann - Ritter Gluck
Washington Irving – A History of New-York from the Beginning of the World to the End of the Dutch Dynasty, by Diedrich Knickerbocker
Ivan Krylov – Basni (Fables)
Catherine Manners – The Lords of Erith
Mary Meeke – Laughton Priory
Hannah More – Coelebs in Search of a Wife
Mary Pilkington – The Mysterious Orphan
Anna Maria Porter – Don Sebastian 
Shikitei Sanba (式亭 三馬) – Ukiyoburo (publication begins)
Louisa Stanhope – The Age We Live In
Elizabeth Thomas – Monte Video

Drama
 Richard Leigh – Grieving's a Folly
Heinrich von Kleist – Die Hermannschlacht
Adam Oehlenschläger – Palnatoke

Non-fiction
Jacob Boehme – De la Triple Vie de l'homme (translated into French by Louis Claude de Saint-Martin)
Lord Byron – English Bards and Scotch Reviewers
Jean-Baptiste Lamarck – Philosophie Zoologique
John Roberton – A Treatise on Medical Police, and on Diet, Regimen, &c

Births
January 19 – Edgar Allan Poe, American poet, short story writer and literary critic (died 1849)
March 6 – David Bates, American poet (died 1870)
March 31
Edward Fitzgerald, English poet (died 1883)
Nikolai Gogol, Russian dramatist, novelist and short story writer (died 1852)
June 3 – Margaret Gatty, English children's writer (died 1873)
June 13 – Heinrich Hoffmann, German author and children's poet (died 1894)
June 19 – Monckton Milnes, English man of letters, poet and politician (died 1885)
August 6 – Alfred Tennyson, English poet (died 1892)
August 29 – Oliver Wendell Holmes, Sr., American poet (died 1894)
September 7 – Wilhelmina Gravallius, Swedish novelist (died 1884)
November 27 – Fanny Kemble, English actress (died 1893)
unknown date – George Ayliffe Poole, English writer and cleric (died 1883)

Deaths
January 3 – Richard Shepherd, English theologian (born c. 1732)
February – John Andrews, English historical writer and pamphleteer (born 1736)
March 11 – Hannah Cowley, English dramatist and poet (born 1743)
March 23 – Thomas Holcroft, English dramatist and miscellanist (born 1745)
March 25 – Anna Seward, English poet (born 1747)
June 8 – Thomas Paine, English political theorist (born 1737)
August 8 – Ueda Akinari, Japanese writer (born 1734)
August 29 – Lucy Barnes, American writer (born 1780)
October 19 – Jean-Henri Gourgaud, French actor (born 1746)
December 20 – Joseph Johnson, English publisher (born 1738)
December 21 – Tiberius Cavallo, Italian physicist and natural philosopher (born 1749)
December 23 – József Fabchich, Hungarian translator of Greek poetry and lexicographer (born 1753)

References

 
Years of the 19th century in literature